Konetsgorye is the name of several rural localities in Arkhangelsk Oblast, Russia:
Konetsgorye, Pinezhsky District, Arkhangelsk Oblast, a village in Trufanogorsky Selsoviet of Pinezhsky District
Konetsgorye, Plesetsky District, Arkhangelsk Oblast, a village in Tarasovsky Selsoviet of Plesetsky District
Konetsgorye, Primorsky District, Arkhangelsk Oblast, a village in Lyavlensky Selsoviet of Primorsky District
Konetsgorye, Vinogradovsky District, Arkhangelsk Oblast, a village in Konetsgorsky Selsoviet of Vinogradovsky District